Polish National Committee was formed in Russian partition during World War I, and grouped Polish politicians who wanted to advance the Polish cause by supporting Russia in World War I. The Committee was recognized by the Entente, and was primarily opposed to Polish factions supporting the Central Powers (in particular, Józef Piłsudski).

The Committee supported the creation of Blue Army under Józef Haller de Hallenburg in France.

Major activists: Roman Dmowski, Zygmunt Wielopolski.

In 1917, after the Russian Revolution, the Committee was reorganized in France. See Polish National Committee (1917–19).

See also
 Ignacy Paderewski

External links
 Henri Kowalski

References

 
1914 establishments in Poland
1917 disestablishments in Poland
Poland in World War I
Establishments in Congress Poland
Political history of Poland
National Democracy
Disestablishments in Congress Poland